Dr. Daniel Przybysz (born March 25, 1988) is a Brazilian Radiation-Oncologist. His practice is mainly focused on lung cancer treatment and high technology approaches toward better patient care.

Przybysz has a medical degree from the Federal University of Parana, Brazil jointly with Harvard Medical School. He graduated in 2013 with high-honors after doing his internships in Oncology-related rotations.

After spending some time at the Massachusetts General Hospital in Boston and at the University of Texas MD Anderson Cancer Center, Przybysz began a Radiation-Oncology program at the Brazilian National Cancer Institute. He graduated residency and was invited to start a position as Visitor Researcher in Radiation-Oncology at the Washington University in St. Louis.

Przybysz also works as an Oncology Reviewer for UpToDate and as an author, editor and reviewer for lung-related articles at the International Journal of Radiation Oncology, Biology and Physics, contributing on high-level reviews for medical content.

Publications
Przybysz's interest in clinical cancer research and outcomes has culminated in several publications, some of listed below:
 
 
 
 Magnetic Resonance Image-Guided Radiation Therapy (MR-IGRT) for the Treatment of Prostate Cancer: Initial Patient Selection and Clinical Experience - Journal of Urology 2017
 Lung SBRT using MRI-guided radiation therapy: possible GTV changes and benefits of adaptive therapy In Silico Trial of MR-Guided Mid-Treatment Adaptive Planning for Hypofractionated Stereotactic Radiotherapy in Centrally Located Thoracic Tumors - IJROBP 2016
 Lung SBRT using MRI-guided radiation therapy: possible GTV changes and benefits of adaptive therapy - SBRT 2016
 
 A comparison between VMAT, IMRT and GAP techniques on the Medulloblastoma approach: different technologies aiming better patient care - Radiology 2015 
 Potential benefits of Neoadjuvant Radiation Therapy On Overall Survival in Advanced Breast Cancer Patients - Radiology 2016 
 
 

Nevertheless, Przybysz is now developing projects using high-technology treatment planning towards better patient care. At present, he is engaged in several studies regarding lung cancer, CNS malignancies and prostate cancer.

He has been recognized and awarded as a Leading Physician of The World by the International Association of Healthcare Providers in 2017.

References 

Brazilian oncologists
Living people
Federal University of Paraná alumni
Washington University in St. Louis people
1988 births